ATP/GTP binding protein 1 is gene that encodes the protein known as cytosolic carboxypeptidase 1 (CCP1), originally named NNA1. Mice with a naturally occurring mutation of the Agtpbp1 gene are known as pcd mice (Purkinje cell degeneration). 

Several spontaneous Agtpbp1 alleles have been discovered in mice. The autosomal recessive Purkinje cell degeneration mutation affects Agtpbp1 located on mouse chromosome 13, with alleles containing a zinc carboxypeptidase domain and an ATP/GTP binding motif, a protein first identified in alpha-motoneurons during axonal regeneration. and destabilized in the mutation.

In Agtpbp1-pcd mutant mice, the predominant pathology comprises near total Purkinje cell loss from the third to the fourth postnatal week along with a more slowly progressing loss in retinal photoreceptors. The slower and less complete degeneration of inferior olive neurons is most probably a consequence of retrograde degeneration secondary to Purkinje cell loss. and the degeneration of deep cerebellar nuclei a consequence of anterograde degeneration secondary to Purkinje cell loss.

Based on sequence similarities, CCP1 was proposed to be involved in tubulin processing along with five other carboxypeptidases, designated CCP2 to CCP6. The abnormal development in Purkinje cell dendrites of Agtpbp1-pcd mice was linked to a decrease in microtubule-associated proteins 1B and 2. Microtubule structure and dynamics can be seen to be impaired in embryonic fibroblasts of Agtpbp1-pcd mice. In particular, Purkinje cell loss in Agtpbp1-pcd mice was linked with microtubule hyperglutamylation, as with human subjects lacking Agtpbp1.

In view of Purkinje cell loss, gamma-aminobutyric acid (GABA) concentrations decreased in the cerebellum of Agtpbp1-pcd mutants. In particular, GABA concentrations decreased in the deep cerebellar nuclei, target of Purkinje axons, but not in cerebellar cortex despite Purkinje cell loss, presumably because the maintenance of inhibitory interneurons compensated for it in a shrunken cerebellum. In line with the Purkinje cell loss, the number of GABAergic terminal boutons declined in deep cerebellar nuclei of Agtpbp1-pcd mutants. while the density of GABAergic soma in the deep cerebellar nuclei was normal. Presumably because of post-synaptic supersensitivity following Purkinje cell loss, binding of the GABA-A receptor and its associated benzodiazepine receptor (BZD) receptor increased in deep cerebellar nuclei of Agtpbp1-pcd mutants. In particular, there was an increase in large aggregates of the GABA-A-alpha receptor subtype in deep cerebellar nuclei.

Presumably because of slowly progressing granule cell deterioration., glutamate concentrations per protein weight decreased in the cerebellar cortex of 6, 9, and 12 month-old Agtpbp1-pcd mutants (McBride  and Ghetti, 1978). On the contrary, their glutamate concentrations per tissue weight were equivalent to controls in cerebellar cortex and deep nuclei at younger ages of 1 to 3 months (Roffler-Tarlov et al., 1979), presumably because of slowly progressing granule cell deterioration. Non-NMDA receptor binding decreased in molecular and granule cell layers of the cerebellar cortex but not the deep nuclei of Agtpbp1-pcd mutants (Stasi et al., 1997). More particularly, the decline in binding occurred for the alpha-amino-3-hydroxy-5-methyl-4-isoxazolepropionic acid (AMPA receptor) receptor at the level of molecular and granule cell layers. The residual presence of AMPA receptors in the molecular layer despite Purkinje cell loss was attributed to the continued maintenance of stellate and basket cells.

Monoamine systems have been examined in view of cerebellar targets by 5-hydroxy-tryptamine (5HT) fibers originating from medial and dorsal raphe nuclei, noradrenaline fibers from the locus coeruleus, and dopamine fibers from the ventral tegmental area.  5HT concentrations increased in the cerebellum of Agtpbp1-pcd mutant mice, as did 5HT fiber density. and 5HT uptake binding. The results are more variable when 5HT content per cerebellum is considered, increases being found only in older (9 and 15 months of age) not younger (3 and 6 months of age) mice.

In a similar manner to the 5HT system, noradrenaline concentrations increased in Agtpbp1-pcd mutants. Noradrenaline uptake per protein weight increased in cerebellar cortex and deep nuclei of Agtpbp1-pcd mutants, but was unchanged when surface areas was taken into account. Increases per protein weight were also discerned in the granule cell layer and deep nuclei for alpha-1-adrenergic receptor and alpha-2-adrenergic receptor binding as well as beta-adrenergic receptor binding in cerebellar cortex. With total area binding in cerebellar cortex, values were still higher than normal for alpha-2-adrenergic receptors but were lower than normal for the other two.

More limited data are available with the other major brain catecholamine, dopamine. Dopamine transporter binding increased in deep cerebellar nuclei but decreased in the cerebellar molecular layer of Agtpbp1-pcd mutants.

Agtpbp1-pcd mutant mice display overt ataxia (widespread gait) together with irregularly spaced strides on foot-print analyses and motor coordination deficits based on kinematic analyses of multijoint, interlimb, and whole-body movements, more missteps, shorter steps, and longer step times in the Erasmus ladder task, and latencies before falling from the rotarod performance test and other apparatus. The mutants also exhibit anomalies in exploratory activities, including spontaneous alternation. In addition, Agtpbp1-pcd mice had slowed acquisition of spatial learning in the Morris water maze while swimming normally towards a visible platform relative to heterozygotes but not wild-type mice.

Function

CCP1/NNA1 is a zinc carboxypeptidase that contains nuclear localization signals that was initially cloned from regenerating spinal cord neurons of the mouse. Although originally thought to contain an ATP/GTP-binding motif, this was not experimentally verified, and the potential domain is not conserved through evolution.

[supplied by OMIM, Jul 2002].

Notes

References

Further reading